The following is a list of schools and school districts in Sussex County, New Jersey and includes both public and private schools that are currently in operation, and an enumeration of defunct institutions.

Before 1942, Sussex County had over 100 school districts. Most of these districts were in rural townships that each had several districts--and each operated a one-room schoolhouse that served their small neighborhoods.  During the forty-year tenure (1903-1942) of County School Superintendent Ralph Decker (1873-?), these individual school districts were dissolved and consolidated into municipal or regional districts.

Universities and colleges
 Sussex County Community College

Secondary schools

Public high schools

Prior to September 2014, Montague Township district sent students across state lines to attend middle school and high school at Port Jervis Middle School and Port Jervis High School, of the Port Jervis City School District, in nearby Port Jervis, New York. That month Montague Township's high school students began attending High Point Regional High, in a shift from Port Jervis that was to take four years to complete.

Private high schools

Elementary or grammar schools (K-8)

Public schools

Private schools
 Hilltop Country Day School (preschool, K-8) in Sparta Township, New Jersey
 Immaculate Conception School (K-8) in Franklin, New Jersey (affiliated Roman Catholic Diocese of Paterson)
 Northwest Christian School (K-8) in Hampton Township, New Jersey
 Reverend George A. Brown School (K-8) in Sparta, New Jersey (affiliated with Roman Catholic Diocese of Paterson)
 Saint Joseph's School (K-8) in Newton, New Jersey (affiliated with Roman Catholic Diocese of Paterson)
 Sussex Christian School (K-8) in Sussex, New Jersey

Defunct institutions
The following schools or academic institutions are no longer in operation:
 Don Bosco College - a Roman Catholic seminary in Newton, New Jersey.
 Newton Collegiate Institute (also called "Newton Academy) - a private all-male school in Newton, New Jersey operated from 1851-1930.
 Upsala College (Wirths Campus) - a satellite campus of the private, Lutheran-affiliated Upsala College in East Orange, New Jersey.

See also
 Sussex County, New Jersey

References